2x45 is the fourth studio album by English band Cabaret Voltaire. It was released in May 1982, through record label Rough Trade.

Background 

The title comes from the album's original format – two 45 RPM 12" discs. This was the last studio album by the band to feature Chris Watson as a member.

Sides A and B were recorded at Western Works, Sheffield in October 1981, while Sides C and D were recorded at Pluto Studios, Manchester in February 1982.

The track "Yashar" was later remixed as a dance record by John Robie and released as a single.

Critical reception 

Trouser Press found 2x45 to be a "temporary letdown" following their previous release, Red Mecca, but went on to say: "Much has been said and written about an industrial, modern-age music; Cabaret Voltaire is the only group doing it... They make perhaps the most important pop music of our time."

Track listing

Personnel 
 Cabaret Voltaire

 Stephen Mallinder – bass guitar, vocals, percussion on "Breathe Deep", "Yashar" and "Protection", tape on "War of Nerves (T.E.S.)", "Wait & Shuffle" and "Get Out of My Face", production
 Richard H. Kirk – guitar, saxophone, synthesizer, clarinet on "Breathe Deep", "Yashar" and "Protection", tape on "War of Nerves (T.E.S.)", "Wait & Shuffle" and "Get Out of My Face", production
 Chris Watson – organ and tape on "Breathe Deep", "Yashar" and "Protection", production

 Additional personnel

 Alan Fish – drums and percussion on "Breathe Deep", "Yashar" and "Protection"
 Nort – drums and percussion on "War of Nerves (T.E.S.)", "Wait & Shuffle" and "Get Out of My Face"
 Eric Random – guitar and percussion on "War of Nerves (T.E.S.)", "Wait & Shuffle" and "Get Out of My Face"
 Neville Brody – sleeve inside artwork
 George Peckham – cutting
 Phil Bush – production and engineering on "War of Nerves (T.E.S.)", "Wait & Shuffle" and "Get Out of My Face"

References

External links 

 

1982 albums
Cabaret Voltaire (band) albums
Mute Records albums